Kristi Kaye DuBose (born October 1, 1964) is a United States district judge of the United States District Court for the Southern District of Alabama.

Early life and education
Born in Brewton, Alabama, DuBose graduated from Huntingdon College with her Bachelor of Arts degree in 1986 and later graduated from the Emory University School of Law in Atlanta with her Juris Doctor in 1989.

Legal career
DuBose started her legal career as a law clerk to former Judge Peter Beer in the  United States District Court for the Eastern District of Louisiana from 1989 to 1990. In 1990, DuBose joined the US Attorney's Office as an Assistant United States Attorney for the Southern District of Alabama from 1990 to 1993 before being appointed Assistant district attorney in the Covington County District Attorney's Office in 1994. In 1994, DuBose was appointed by Jim Folsom, Jr. the Governor of Alabama a Deputy attorney general in the Alabama Attorney General's Office from 1994 to 1996 before serving as Chief counsel for Alabama's Senior U.S. Senator Jeff Sessions from 1997 to 1999.

Federal judicial career
On the unanimous recommendation of Senators Jeff Sessions and Richard Shelby, DuBose was nominated by President George W. Bush on September 28, 2005 to a seat vacated by Charles Randolph Butler Jr. DuBose was confirmed by the Senate on December 21, 2005 and received commission on December 27, 2005. She served as Chief Judge from 2017 to 2021.

References

Sources

1964 births
Living people
21st-century American judges
21st-century American women judges
Assistant United States Attorneys
Emory University School of Law alumni
Huntingdon College alumni
Judges of the United States District Court for the Southern District of Alabama
People from Brewton, Alabama
United States district court judges appointed by George W. Bush
United States magistrate judges